The tenth season of the animated comedy series Bob's Burgers premiered on Fox on September 29, 2019, and concluded on May 17, 2020.

Production
In April 2020, the show joined the rest of Fox's Animation Domination lineup in a partnership with Caffeine for the AniDom Beyond Show, a recap show hosted by Andy Richter. The hour-long program featured interviews with guests and live interactivity with fans online, with recaps for the episodes that aired through April and May. The Bob's Burgers episode aired on May 3, 2020, featuring Loren Bouchard, Wendy Molyneux, Steven Davis, Lizzie Molyneux, and H. Jon Benjamin. On May 18, 2020, Holly Schlesinger joined the show with other writers from the Fox Animation Domination lineup.

The DVD for season 10 was released on June 23, 2020.

Episodes

References

External links
 Official website
 
 

2019 American television seasons
2020 American television seasons
Bob's Burgers seasons